The Petre Shotadze Tbilisi Medical Academy, commonly referred to as Tbilisi Medical Academy, is a Georgian private medical university  located in Tbilisi. The university was founded in 1992 by Petre Shotadze, in whose honor it was posthumously renamed.

The University offers 6 year educational program in Medicine.

External links
Official website

Medical schools in Georgia (country)
Universities in Georgia (country)
1992 establishments in Georgia (country)
Educational institutions established in 1992